Aantjes is a Dutch surname. Notable people with the surname include:

 Johan Aantjes (born 1958), Dutch water polo player
 Willem Aantjes (1923–2015), Dutch politician

References 

Dutch-language surnames
Patronymic surnames